Tunungwant Creek is a  long fifth-order tributary to the Allegheny River. This is the only stream of this name in the United States.

Course

Watershed

See also 
 List of rivers of New York
 List of rivers of Pennsylvania

External Links 
 Tuna Valley Trail Association

References

Rivers of New York (state)
Rivers of Pennsylvania
Tributaries of the Allegheny River
Rivers of Cattaraugus County, New York
Rivers of McKean County, Pennsylvania